is a song by Japanese singer Yoshie Kashiwabara, released as her 12th single on January 11, 1983.

Background and release

"Haru na no ni" is a song by Yoshie Kashiwabara, released as her 12th single. The song was composed by Miyuki Nakajima. The song was also the title track of Kashiwabara's debut album of the same name.

The single was released on January 11, 1983 under the Philips Records label, along with the B-side "Nagisa Tayori", a song originally written and performed by Nakajima from her 1976 album, Watashi no Koe ga Kikoemasu ka. "Haru na no ni" was re-released as a single on February 25, 1994 by Mercury Music Entertainment, coupled with "Camouflage" as a B-side.

Reception
"Haru na no ni" reached No. 6 on the Oricon Weekly Singles Chart, selling at least 33,000 copies. Because of its spring theme, the song is often used as a graduation song for Japanese students graduating in the spring.

Track listing

1983 version

1994 version

Charts

Awards and nominations

Showta version

Background and release

Showta released a cover of "Haru na no ni" as his 5th single on January 23, 2008. While recording demo songs, Showta's producer had him sing  songs and had decided to release his cover rendition of "Haru na no ni" as a single.

Tadashi Harada, who had previously worked on Shiseido commercials and won the Grand Prix Award in the JMan Make-up Contest, was in charge of the CD jacket and decided on a "diva" concept, where Showta was depicted in rhinestones and blond hair that portrayed his androgyny.

Reception

"Haru na no ni" peaked at No. 90 on the Oricon Weekly Singles Chart. CDJournal praised Showta's "vibrant singing voice", describing it as sounding like a woman, while also calling the B-side, "Go-gatsu Ame no Uta", "impressive" and comparing it to a graduation song.

Track listing

Charts

References

1983 singles
1983 songs
Japanese-language songs